"Trap" is a song by Colombian singer-songwriter Shakira released as the seventh official single from El Dorado on 26 January 2018. The track features another Colombian singer Maluma, who had previously worked with Shakira on "Chantaje", the lead single of El Dorado and the remix of Shakira and Carlos Vives' single "La Bicicleta", also included on El Dorado. Its lyrics were written by Shakira and Maluma. Its musical composition was done by Shakira, Maluma, Rene Cano Rios, Kevin Mauricio Jiménez Londoño and Bryan Snaider Lezcano Chaverra.

Music video
Shakira and Maluma filmed the music video for the song in Barcelona in March 2017. It was filmed on the same day as Shakira's album photoshoot. It was directed by her longtime collaborator Jaume de Laiguana. Shakira began posting different teases of the video on her social networks on 23 January 2018, and Maluma did the same on his social media the following day. Shakira announced the release of the video the day before its release. It was eventually released on 26 January.

Charts

Certifications

References

2017 songs
2018 singles
Songs written by Shakira
Shakira songs
Maluma songs
Songs written by Maluma (singer)